DeWayne Lewis (born October 4, 1985) is an American football cornerback who is currently a free agent.

While attending high school, Lewis won the Colorado state championship in both the 100-meter and 200-meter sprints three consecutive years.  He attended Michigan State University for 3 years of football under coach John L. Smith and ran track and field. Lewis was all Big Ten in track and field posting some of Big Ten fastest 60 meter dash times. Lewis was one of fastest players in Big Ten. Lewis suffered a shoulder injury which sideline him vs NorteDome. Most improved player Lewis received an art degree before transferring to Southern Utah University (SUU).  At SUU, Lewis played college football helping pioneer SUU as a football program around the professional football likes. Lewis was one of SUU first player to make the NFL. Lewis competed with some of the nations top NFL prospects throughout his college career. Lewis stepped on the big stage when he was selected to compete with the nations top NFL prospects from major colleges around the country in a Bowl game to show case his talent among the Elites. Lewis Pro day was held at BYU where 23 NFL teams showed up to see Lewis perform before that year NFL Draft. At SUU when and competed as a sprinter from 2008 to 2010.  He advanced to the NCAA Track and Field Championships in 2009, won nine conference NCAA championships twice in the 100-meter sprint, and four times broke the school record in the 60-meter dash and 100-meter dash.

Lewis signed with the Jacksonville Jaguars in 2010 and with the Cincinnati Bengals in 2012.  Signed with the Chicago Bears 2013. In 2014, he spent time with the New England patriots tryout. He was selected by USA Football to play for the 2011 United States national American football team.  He helped lead Team USA to the gold medal at the 2011 IFAF World Championship in Austria and was selected as an All-World defensive back and received the award as the Best Defensive Back at the World Championship.

Early years
Lewis attended Thomas Jefferson High School in Denver, Colorado, where he led his team to the quarterfinal stage of the 2001 Colorado playoffs and to the semifinals in 2002.  Lewis was also the fastest sprinter in the State of Colorado, winning the state championship in both the 100-meters and 200-meters three straight years.  In his senior year, Lewis was the state champion in three events.  The Denver Post wrote at the time: "The day before his graduation Lewis became the fastest young man in Colorado. Three times over. Lewis, a speed horse, won a breathtaking Triple Crown on Saturday."

College career

Michigan State
In college, Lewis continued to compete in both football and track.  He competed in track at Michigan State University, running the 60-meter event in 6.87 seconds in February 2006, and winning the event at the 2006 Kangaroo Invitational.  Lewis also participated in Michigan State's spring football practice in 2005, but did not play in the regular season due to a shoulder injury.

In the fall of 2007, Lewis transferred to Southern Utah University (SUU).  Michigan State head football coach John L. Smith said at the time that he liked Lewis's speed and wanted him to return, but Lewis sought a transfer to be closer to his mother.  Smith contacted SUU's defensive coordinator Cole Wilson, who recruited Lewis to SUU.

Southern Utah
At SUU, Lewis competed in both football and track.  He played football at SUU for three years (2006-2008), appearing in 32 games, including 28 games as a starter.  He finished his college football career with 199 tackles and six interceptions.

In the fall of 2007, Lewis played in 10 games at cornerback, seven as a starter.  In 2008, he totaled 51 tackles, four interceptions, and 13 pass break-ups, and was named the Great West Conference Player of the Week after playing Montana State.  After Lewis's performance against Montana State, SUU defensive coordinator Cole Wilson said: "He's got the right frame of mind. It's Division I football here. You can make it big-time wherever you are."

As a senior, he played in the 2009 East Coast Bowl All-Star Game, an all-star game featuring players from smaller colleges and universities, where he had several pass break ups during the game. He also ran a 4.26 40-yard sprint at BYU's pro day.

Lewis also competed in track at Southern Utah.  He was a seven-time Mid-Continent Conference/The Summit League 100-meter champion while attending SUU.  His sprinting career suffered a setback when he dislocated his shoulder at SUU's spring football game in April 2008.  Lewis recalled the injury: "It was like a dagger. I felt like it was over for me, both track and football. But I stayed focused and keep the drive and determination and came back."  One month after the injury, Lewis qualified for the NCAA West Regional with a time of 10.61 seconds at the Mid-Continent Conference Championships. At the West Regional, Lewis qualified to advance to the NCAA Track and Field Championships with a time of 10.40 seconds.  Lewis recalled his participation in the NCAA Track and Field Championship: "That was a great experience. It doesn't get any higher than that: To get a chance to face those guys at the top of the collegiate level."

Lewis also twice broke Southern Utah's 60-meter dash record, with times of 6.88 in 2007 and 6.72 in 2008.  He was named the conference's athlete of the week four times.  In February 2009, Lewis was named one of the top 50 sprinters in the country.  He was also named SUU's Male Athlete of the Year in April 2008.

Professional football
In April 2009, Lewis signed an NFL contract with the Jacksonville Jaguars.  He came to the attention of the Jaguars after running a sub 4.3 40-yard dash at BYU's pro day in March 2009 running a 4.28.  At the time, Lewis said: "This is a great opportunity for me. I'm going to take this blessing and do what I can to make the best of it. The Jaguars love speed and they gave me an opportunity. Now I'm trying to get mentally ready for camp that starts later this week."

In April 2010, Lewis was given a tryout with the Cincinnati Bengals. On May 3, 2010, Lewis was signed by the Bengals. He was the Bengals' special team rookie in the 2010 season.  Lewis was placed on injured reserve status after he sustained an ankle injury in the beginning of the 2010 season.

In April 2012 – 2014, Lewis received a tryout with the Chicago Bears before making practice squad with New England Patriots.

2011 IFAF World Championship
In June 2011, Lewis was selected by USA Football to play for the 2011 United States national American football team at the 2011 IFAF World Championship in Austria.  With 13 tackles, three tackles for loss, two blocked punts, one interception, and three pass breakups in four games, Lewis helped lead Team USA to the gold medal at the 2011 World Championship.  He was selected as a first-team All-World defensive back and received the award as the Best Defensive Back at the 2011 World Championship.

References

External links
nfldraftscout.com
SUU profile

1985 births
Living people
American football cornerbacks
Cincinnati Bengals players
Southern Utah Thunderbirds football players
Players of American football from Denver
Wyoming Cavalry players